The K. D. Singh Babu Stadium, Barabanki, is a district stadium in Barabanki city, named after the famous hockey player K. D. Singh. The stadium is equipped with indoor and outdoor facilities including a swimming pool.

Championships, tournaments
Following events have been held in K. D. Singh Babu Stadium, Barabanki,
22nd U.P. Junior/Sub Junior/Senior State Taekwondo Championship' 2004 from 14 to 16 May 2004.
The inaugural match of the 4th prize-money state cricket tournament organised by the District Sports Welfare Society Barabanki and District Cricket Association Barabanki.
Matches of the 4th Chaudhary Asif Ali Memorial Prize Money State Cricket Tournament.
The first semi-final match of the 5th Chaudhary Asif Ali Memorial Prize Money State Cricket Tournament on 13 March 2012.

References

Barabanki, Uttar Pradesh
Sports venues in Uttar Pradesh
Cricket grounds in Uttar Pradesh
Defunct cricket grounds in India
Year of establishment missing